Harnden is a surname. Notable people with the surname include:

Arthur Harnden (1924–2016), American sprinter
E. J. Harnden (born 1983), Canadian curler
Henry Harnden (1823–1900), Union Army general
Iain Harnden (born 1976), Zimbabwean hurdler
Ken Harnden (born 1973), Zimbabwean hurdler
Ryan Harnden (born 1986), Canadian curler
Toby Harnden (born 1966), English journalist and writer
William F. Harnden (1812–1845), American businessman

See also
Harnden Tavern, historic tavern in Wilmington, Massachusetts
Harnden Farm, historic farmhouse in Andover, Massachusetts